The floghera is a type of flute used in Greek folk music. It is a simple end-blown bamboo flute without a fipple, which is played by directing a narrow air stream against its sharp, open upper end. It typically has seven finger holes.

See also
Greek musical instruments
Greek music
Greek folk music

References

End-blown flutes
Greek musical instruments